is a railway station in Aoi-ku, Shizuoka, Shizuoka Prefecture, Japan, operated by the private railway company, Shizuoka Railway (Shizutetsu). It is located within the Shin-Shizuoka Cenova shopping complex.

Lines
Shin-Shizuoka Station is a terminal station of the Shizuoka–Shimizu Line and is 11.0 kilometers from the opposing terminus of the line at Shin-Shimizu Station.

Station layout
The station has two island platforms serving three tracks. The station building has automated ticket machines, and automated turnstiles, which accept the LuLuCa smart card ticketing system as well as the PiTaPa and ICOCA IC cards. The station is staffed.

Adjacent stations

|-
!colspan=5| Shizuoka Railway Company

History
It was renamed "Shin-Shizuoka" on October 1, 1954. Shizuoka's city tram system was discontinued in September 1962, and a large bus terminal was established at Shin-Shizuoka Station on May 10, 1966. The Shin-Shizuoka Center department store above the station was opened on May 15, 1966. This was closed and demolished at the end of January 2009, and a new, larger shopping complex called Cenova opened October 5, 2011.

Passenger statistics
In fiscal 2017, the station was used by an average of 9,768 passengers daily (boarding passengers only).

Surrounding area
Shizuoka Station
Shizuoka Prefectural Offices
Shizuoka City Hall
site of Sunpu Castle

See also
 List of railway stations in Japan

References

External links

 Shizuoka Railway official website

Railway stations in Shizuoka Prefecture
Railway stations in Japan opened in 1908
Railway stations in Shizuoka (city)